Dr. Arcadio Santos Avenue or Dr. Santos Avenue, formerly and still referred to as Sucat Road or Parañaque–Sucat Road, is the primary east–west thoroughfare in Parañaque, southern Metro Manila, Philippines. The avenue's western end is in Barangay San Dionisio as the continuation of Ninoy Aquino Avenue. Physically, Ninoy Aquino Avenue connects northbound to NAIA Road in Pasay which, in turn, continues west to Roxas Boulevard back in Parañaque, where it ends. Its eastern end is at the East Service Road, which runs parallel to South Luzon Expressway, in Barangay Sucat, Muntinlupa, where it becomes Meralco Road to service the rest of the route to Sucat railway station.

The entire road is designated as National Route 63 (N63) of the Philippine highway network.

History
The avenue was originally called Sucat Road and was named for the barrio in Muntinlupa and its railway station to which it led. Its present name is taken from Dr. Arcadio Santos, a native of Parañaque who served as the representative (1916–1919) and governor (1920–1922) of Rizal when the then-municipality was still part of the province.

In September 2013, a bill was authored in the Philippine House of Representatives to rename Dr. Santos Avenue to President Cory Aquino Avenue. This bill authored by Representative Eric Olivarez (Parañaque–1st) is still pending in the Committee on Public Works and Highways as of October 2013.

The avenue will soon be served by the Manila Light Rail Transit Line 1 (via Dr. Santos station) to be constructed in the vicinity of C-5 Extension.

Route description

Dr. Santos Avenue runs through barangays San Dionisio, San Isidro, San Antonio, and BF Homes in Parañaque and Sucat in Muntinlupa. It begins in San Dionisio as the continuation of Ninoy Aquino Avenue south of Ninoy Aquino International Airport Terminal 1, where the road narrows to three lanes from four. The road continues due east to cross C-5 Road Extension, N. Lopez Avenue, President's Avenue, and the South Luzon Expressway (Sucat Interchange). It terminates at the East Service Road, which runs parallel to the expressway next to the interchange. It then continues east towards the Sucat railway station as Meralco Road.

The eastern section of the avenue is known as the location of two of Metro Manila's biggest cemeteries, such as Manila Memorial Park and Loyola Memorial Park. Notable places located along the road also include two SM shopping malls such as SM City Sucat and SM City BF Parañaque, Amvel Business Park, which houses the El Shaddai church, and the Santana Grove strip mall.

Intersections

Landmarks

Dr. Santos Avenue is home to several new commercial developments, particularly near its intersection with C-5 Road extension in San Dionisio, such as the Amvel City (formerly Amvel Business Park), SM City Sucat, Fields Residences, and Avida Towers Sucat. Another development on the avenue is the area near its intersection with President's Avenue in BF Homes which includes SM City BF Parañaque, Amaia Steps Sucat and Santana Grove which houses a Shopwise. This area is also the location of Medical Center Parañaque, Elorde Sports Center, the Manila Memorial Park, and Loyola Memorial Park. The Parañaque City Hall is accessible by turning north on San Antonio Avenue. Between Lopez Avenue and Canaynay Avenue are some of the older shopping centers on the avenue including Walter Mart Sucat, Liana's Shopping Mall, Jaka Plaza, Savemore Sucat, and Uniwide Warehouse Club Sucat (now Super8). Olivarez College and Parañaque National High School are some of the biggest educational institutions located on the avenue near San Dionisio's border with San Isidro.

References

Streets in Metro Manila